Drexciya is a German-Burkinabe 2013 short film. The film premiered at the 2013 Film Festival Max Ophüls Preis in Saarbrücken, Germany.

Synopsis 
Thomas is a smuggler, shipping European refugees who hope to find a better life in Africa. One day his boat sinks and he is washed up on the African coast as the only survivor. He then makes his way to the nearest city - Drexciya.

Screenings 
 Film festival Max Ophüls Preis 2013, Saarbrücken, Germany
 International Film Festival 2013, Pristina, Kosovo
 Okayafrica - The Future Weird: Black Atlantis, New York 2013, USA
 The Shadows Took Shape - Studio Museum Harlem, New York 2014, USA
 Goethe-Institut Washington, USA 2014
 Goethe-Institut Ouagadougou, Burkina Faso 2014

References 
 Studio Museum Harlem, Videos and Context
 Drexciya at the Internet Movie Database
 Drexciya at Africine.org
 Drexciya at the Academy of Media Arts

Burkinabé drama films
Burkinabé short films
German drama short films
2010s German films